Jetpiloter is a 1961 Danish family film directed by Anker Sørensen and starring Ebbe Langberg.

Cast
 Ebbe Langberg - Flyverløjtnant Ras
 Henning Palner - Flyverløjtnant Jan
 Poul Reichhardt - Oberstløjtnant Bording
 Henning Moritzen - Kaptajn Tom Jessen
 Malene Schwartz - Lise Jessen
 Ib Mossin - Flightcommander Pau
 Birthe Wilke - Birthe Pau
 Susse Wold - Grethe
 William Kisum - Flyverløjtnant Sid
 Jørgen Buckhøj - Flyverløjtnant Pen
 Poul Schleisner - Kaptajnløjtnant Jok
 Peter Marcell - Flyveleder i kontroltårn
 Anker Taasti - Sergent Røj
 Bent Thalmay - Instruktør i træningsfly
 Ove Rud - Chefen på MTB'erne
 Frank Pilo - Chefen's næstkommanderende
 Baard Owe - Flyverlæge
 Helge Scheuer - Sergent
 Kurt Erik Nielsen - En overfenrik
 Klaus Nielsen - Pilot i eskadrille 794
 Morten Grunwald - Pilot i eskadrille 794
 Lise Henningsen - Sygeplejerske
 Hugo Herrestrup

External links

1961 films
Danish children's films
1960s Danish-language films